Xujiahui is an interchange station between lines 1, 9 and 11 of the Shanghai Metro. It is located in the Xujiahui area of Xuhui District, Shanghai. The station is one of the busiest in the metro system, and is extremely crowded during peak hours. Six large shopping malls and eight large office towers are each within no more than a three-minute walk of one of the station's exits. The station has a total of 20 exits, more than any other subway station in Shanghai.

This station is part of the initial southern section of the line that opened on 28 May 1993; the interchanges with Line 9 and Line 11 opened respectively on 31 December 2009 and 31 August 2013.

Places nearby
 Xujiahui shopping district
 St. Ignatius Cathedral [Exit 3]
 Fudan University, Fenlin Road Campus
 Shanghai Jiao Tong University, Xuhui Campus
 Bibliotheca Zi-Ka-Wei
 Shanghai Astronomical Observatory Xujiahui;

Station Layout

Gallery

References

Shanghai Metro stations in Xuhui District
Railway stations in China opened in 1993
Line 1, Shanghai Metro
Line 9, Shanghai Metro
Line 11, Shanghai Metro